There were several Treaties of Basel:

Treaty of Basel (1499)
Peace of Basel (1795)
The Basel Convention on the Control of Transboundary Movements of Hazardous Wastes and Their Disposal (1989)